Always Another Dawn is a 1948 Australian wartime melodrama directed by T.O. McCreadie. It was the first leading role for Bud Tingwell.

Synopsis
Terry Regan, from Camden, New South Wales, is the son of Molly Regan and a naval officer who died in action in 1916. Terry is called up to serve in the navy during World War II, and turns down a commission in order to see action early. He becomes friends with fellow sailor Warren and serves in the Mediterranean on HMAS Dauntless for two years. While home on leave he falls in love with his neighbour's daughter, Patricia, and they plan to marry on his next leave. Dauntless is attacked and sunk by the Japanese during the Battle of the Java Sea; Terry is killed but Warren is among a handful of survivors. He goes to visit Molly and they talk about Terry.

Cast
Bud Tingwell as Terry Regan
Guy Doleman as Warren Melville
Queenie Ashton as Molly Regan
Frank Waters

Production
The script was co-written by New Zealand author Zelma Roberts whose husband had been killed on active service with the New Zealand armed forces.

It was Charles Tingwell's first lead role and only his second film. Terrence Coy, who plays Tingwell as a boy, won his role in a competition.

Although the ship in the film, Dauntless, was fictitious, it is based on the real-life , which was sunk by the Japanese in 1942 with only 13 survivors.

The film was made with the co-operation of the Royal Australian Navy. Shooting began in February 1947 and lasted six months, taking place at Flinders Naval Depot, Camden, and aboard the destroyer . A small studio was provided by Commonwealth Film Laboratories. During filming of the final battle in Port Phillip Bay, £300 went missing from the Bataan which represented payroll for the film crew.

Post production took another four months.

Release
A novel was published in 1948.

Box office
The film only lasted in Sydney cinemas for two weeks but a shortened version was released in England.

Critical
Critical reception was not strong, the critic from The Sydney Morning Herald claiming that "the dialogue is stilted and unreal, character development is inadequate and stodgy, and the tale is not crystallised in terms of fluent camera action." The Argus thought "the film scores in its camera work - and in being 'so close to home.' The handling of its rather tragic story and its efforts to introduce comedy are not quite so impressive. Charles Tingwell and Gus Doleman are interesting male leads."

In later years Quentin Turnour, chief programmer with the National Film and Sound Archive, said the film demonstrated the tendency of Australian war movies to focus on the "reluctant warrior... By the time of Rats of Tobruk we're seeing that very laconic tone, a movie much more about the personal experience. Always Another Dawn... about the experience of Australian sailors, is a good example of that. There's a lot of sadness in that film, no glorification of war."

References

External links

Always Another Dawn at Oz Movies
Charles Tingwell career interview - discusses making of the film 
Always Another Dawn at National Film and Sound Archive
Review of film at Variety

Australian war drama films
1948 films
1940s war drama films
World War II naval films
Pacific War films
Australian black-and-white films
Melodrama films
1948 drama films
1940s Australian films
1940s English-language films